The Dead River, sometimes called the West Branch, is a  river in central Maine in the United States. Its source is Flagstaff Lake, where its two main tributaries, South Branch Dead River and North Branch Dead River, join. It flows generally east to join the Kennebec River at The Forks, Maine.

The Dead River played a role in the American Revolution. In the fall of 1775 then newly commissioned Colonel Benedict Arnold led a force of over 1000 men on a grueling trip through Maine, as part of the invasion of Canada. They proceeded up the North Branch of the Dead River, through the Chain of Ponds to Arnold Pond in Coburn Gore (T.2/3 R.6 WBKP), and across the height of land into the watershed of Quebec's Chaudière River.

The logging industry is prominent in the area.  Flagstaff Lake was formed by Long Falls Dam in 1950, to regulate the flow of the Dead River into the Kennebec River.  At the time, the river drive was still a primary means of delivering timber to the pulp mills downstream.  Although improved highways and the trucking industry have replaced the river drive, water releases continue to serve hydroelectric power-generating plants downstream.

Recreation 
The majestic Bigelow Mountain Range looks down from Flagstaff Lake's southern shore, making the Dead River region a scenic favorite for outdoor enthusiasts.

It is a popular river with whitewater boaters and rafters. The whitewater releases are controlled from Flagstaff Lake, which has been dammed and made into a reservoir, and range from 1200 to 7000 ft³/s (35–200 m³/s) and range in difficulty from easy class 2 to class 4+. Boaters must be prepared for at least 5 hours of paddling of varying difficulty. There are 8 whitewater releases every rafting season with 7,000+cfs releases in the spring, 3500cfs in the summer and 6000cfs in the fall.

The Northern Forest Canoe Trail (NFCT) is a  marked canoeing route extending from Old Forge, New York, to Fort Kent, Maine. From a four-mile portage between Wrangler on Wrangler Lake and Dallas Plantation on the South Branch, the trail runs about  down the Dead River, to the mouth of Spencer Stream below Grand Falls.

References

External links 

Tributaries of the Kennebec River
Rivers of Franklin County, Maine
Rivers of Somerset County, Maine
North Maine Woods
Northern Forest Canoe Trail
Rivers of Maine